Reeve Peter Frosler (born 11 January 1998) is a South African professional soccer player who plays as a right back for Kaizer Chiefs in the South African Premier Division.

Club career

Bidvest Wits
Frosler started his career as a winger in the Bidvest Wits academy before being converted to the full-back position by coach Gavin Hunt. He made 11 appearances in his debut season during which he helped the club win its first ever PSL title. Ahead of the 2018–19 campaign, Frosler reportedly refused a new contract with Wits which resulted in him being frozen out at the club. By the half-way mark of the season, he had not played a single minute of football and signed a pre-contract with the club's rivals, Kaizer Chiefs.

Kaizer Chiefs
Although initially meant to join the club in June, Frosler joined Kaizer Chiefs on the transfer deadline in January 2019 after an agreement was reached with Wits.

References

External links
 

1998 births
Living people
South African soccer players
South Africa under-20 international soccer players
South Africa youth international soccer players
Association football defenders
Bidvest Wits F.C. players
Kaizer Chiefs F.C. players
South African Premier Division players
Cape Coloureds
Sportspeople from Port Elizabeth
Footballers at the 2020 Summer Olympics
Olympic soccer players of South Africa
Soccer players from the Eastern Cape